The 2004 FIBA Africa Basketball Club Championship (19th edition), was an international basketball tournament  held in Cairo, Egypt, from November 20 to 27, 2004. The tournament, organized by FIBA Africa and hosted by Al Ahly, was contested by 7 teams in two groups, in a preliminary round robin system followed by a knockout stage.
 
The tournament was won by Primeiro de Agosto from Angola.

Qualification

Draw

Squads

Preliminary round
Times given below are in UTC+2.

Group A

Group B

Knockout stage

5th place match

Semifinals

Bronze medal game

Final

Final standings

All Tournament Team

See also 
2005 FIBA Africa Championship

References

External links 
 2004 FIBA Africa Champions Cup Official Website
 FIBA Africa official website

2004
2004 in African basketball
2004 in Egyptian sport
International basketball competitions hosted by Egypt